This was the first edition of the tournament.

Maxime Janvier and Malek Jaziri won the title after defeating Théo Arribagé and Titouan Droguet 6–3, 7–6(7–5) in the final.

Seeds

Draw

References

External links
 Main draw

Internationaux de Tennis de Toulouse - Doubles